Eugenia truncata is a species of plant in the family Myrtaceae. It is found from Costa Rica to Panama.

References

truncata
Flora of Costa Rica
Flora of Panama